Spiniductellus is a genus of moths in the family Gelechiidae.

Species
Spiniductellus atraphaxi Bidzilya & Karsholt, 2008
Spiniductellus flavonigrum Bidzilya & Karsholt, 2008

References

Anomologini